Rasheed Amar Walker (born February 13, 2000) is an American football offensive tackle for the Green Bay Packers of the National Football League (NFL). He played college football at Penn State.

Early life and high school career
Walker grew up in Waldorf, Maryland and attended North Point High School. He was selected to play in the 2018 US Army All-American Bowl as a senior. Walker was rated a four-star recruit and committed to play college football at Penn State over offers from Ohio State, Maryland, and Virginia Tech.

College career
Walker played in four games during his true freshman season before redshirting the rest of the year. He was named the Nittany Lions' starting left tackle during training camp before his redshirt freshman season and started all 13 of the team's games. Walker was named third-team All-Big Ten Conference after starting all nine of Penn State's games in the team's COVID-19-shortened 2020 season. As a redshirt junior, he started ten games and was named honorable mention All-Big Ten. After the season, Walker announced that he would forgo his remaining collegiate eligibility and enter the 2022 NFL Draft.

Professional career
Walker was drafted by the Green Bay Packers in the seventh round (249th overall) of the 2022 NFL Draft. On May 9, 2022, he signed his rookie contract. He saw his first NFL action on December 25, 2022, playing four special teams snaps in a Week 16 victory over the Miami Dolphins.

References

External links
Green Bay Packers bio
Penn State Nittany Lions bio

Living people
2000 births
American football offensive tackles
Penn State Nittany Lions football players
People from Waldorf, Maryland
Players of American football from Maryland
Sportspeople from the Washington metropolitan area
Green Bay Packers players